Semiconductor characterization techniques are used to characterize a semiconductor material or device (PN junction, Schottky diode, solar cell, etc.). Some examples of semiconductor properties that could be characterized include the depletion width, carrier concentration, carrier generation and recombination rates, carrier lifetimes, defect concentration, and trap states.

Electrical characterization techniques
Electrical characterization can be used to determine resistivity, carrier concentration, mobility, contact resistance, barrier height, depletion width, oxide charge, interface states, carrier lifetimes, and deep level impurities.

 Two-point probe
 Four-point probe
 Differential Hall effect
 Capacitance voltage profiling
 Deep-level transient spectroscopy (DLTS)
 Electron beam-induced current
 Drive-level capacitance profiling (DLCP)
 Current–voltage characteristic (I–V)
 Suns–VOC (Pseudo I–V)
 Photoconductance decay (PCD)

Optical characterization techniques
 Microscopy
 Ellipsometry
 Photoluminescence
 Electroluminescence
 Absorption or transmission spectroscopy
 Raman spectroscopy
 Fourier-transform infrared spectroscopy
 Reflectance modulation
 Cathodoluminescence

Physical and chemical characterization techniques
 Electron beam techniques 
 Scanning Electron Microscopy (SEM)
 Transmission Electron Microscopy (TEM)
 Auger electron spectroscopy (AES)
 Electron microprobe (EMP)
 Electron energy loss spectroscopy (EELS)
 Ion beam techniques 
 Sputtering
 Secondary ion mass spectrometry (SIMS)
 Rutherford backscattering spectrometry (RBS)
 X-ray techniques 
 X-ray fluorescence (XRF) 
 X-ray photoelectron spectroscopy (XPS)
 X-ray diffraction (XRD)
 X-ray topography
 Neutron activation analysis (NAA)
 Chemical etching

Future characterization methods 
Many of these techniques have been perfected for silicon, making it the most studied semiconductor material. This is a result of silicon's affordability and prominent use in computing. As other fields such as power electronics, LED devices, and photovoltaics develop, characterization of a variety of alternative materials (including organic semiconductors will continue to increase in importance. Many existing characterization methods will need to be adapted to accommodate the peculiarities of these new materials.

References 
 Schroder, Dieter K. Semiconductor Material and Device Characterization. 3rd Ed. John Wiley and Sons, Inc. Hoboken, New Jersey, 2006.
 McGuire, Gary E. Characterization of Semiconductor Materials: Principles and Methods. Vol 1. Noyes Publications, Park Ridge, New Jersey, 1989.

Semiconductor analysis